Piotr Osiecki (born 22 December 1961, in Sochaczew) is Polish politician, and former rugby union footballer. He played 35 matches for Poland national rugby union team. Since 2010 he is a mayor of Sochaczew town. He is member of Right of the Republic party.

References 

 Biography on rugby.info.pl (in Polish) [Access 2012-09-05].
 Info on Sochaczew's site (in Polish) [Access 2012-09-05].

1961 births
Mayors of places in Poland
Polish rugby union players
Living people
People from Sochaczew
Right Wing of the Republic politicians
Sportspeople from Masovian Voivodeship